Andrew Jerome Maggi (born May 16, 1989) is an Italian–American professional baseball infielder in the Pittsburgh Pirates organization. Maggi is currently a phantom ballplayer, having spent two days on the Minnesota Twins' active roster but never appeared in a major league game.

Career

Pittsburgh Pirates
Maggi was drafted by the Arizona Diamondbacks in the 47th round of the 2008 MLB Draft out of Brophy College Preparatory in Phoenix but did not sign. He was then drafted by the Pittsburgh Pirates in the 15th round of the 2010 MLB Draft out of Arizona State University, and signed for a $465,000 bonus.

Maggi was named to the 2010 USA Baseball where he hit the game tying homerun in the gold medal game and was named tournament defensive MVP of the championship against Cuba.Collegiate National Team.

Maggi played in the Pirates organization from 2010-2014 and was a three-time mid-season all star, including being an Eastern League mid-season All-Star in 2014.

Los Angeles Angels
Maggi then signed with the Los Angeles Angels of Anaheim as a minor league free agent in 2015. Maggi was named a Texas League mid-season all star in the 2015 season for the AA Arkansas Travelers, where he hit .242 in 125 games.

Los Angeles Dodgers
Maggi signed with the Los Angeles Dodgers as a minor league free agent for the 2016 season. He split the season between the AA Tulsa Drillers and the AAA Oklahoma City Dodgers, and hit .289 in 110 combined games. Maggi was also a midseason All-Star in the Texas League in 2016. In 2017 with Oklahoma City, he hit .271 in 84 games.

Cleveland Indians
On November 22, 2017, Maggi was signed by the Cleveland Indians to a minor league contract with an invitation to the club's 2018 spring training camp. On April 4, 2018, Maggi was suspended 50 games after testing positive for Amphetamine. He elected free agency on November 3, 2018.

Minnesota Twins
On January 16, 2019, Maggi signed a minor league contract with the Minnesota Twins that included an invitation to spring training. He became a free agent following the 2019 season. Maggi was selected as an MILB.com Organizational All Star in 2019, and became a free agent after the season. On December 20, 2019, Maggi re-signed with the Twins. Due to the cancellation of the Minor League Baseball season because of the COVID-19 pandemic, Maggi spent the 2020 season at the alternate training camp for the Twins and became a free agent at seasons end. On February 8, 2021, Maggi re-signed with the Twins on a minor league contract.
On September 18, 2021, after playing in 86 games for the Triple-A St. Paul Saints, hitting .261 with 16 home runs and 48 RBI's, the Twins selected Maggi's contract, but was optioned back to the St. Paul Saints on September 20 without appearing in a major league game. On October 8, Maggi was outrighted off of the 40-man roster. He became a free agent following the season.

Philadelphia Phillies
On March 8, 2022, Maggi signed a minor league contract with the Philadelphia Phillies.

Pittsburgh Pirates (second stint)
On August 3, 2022, the Phillies traded Maggi to the Pittsburgh Pirates in exchange for cash. He elected free agency on November 10, 2022. On January 5, 2023, Maggi re-signed a minor league deal.

International baseball
Maggi was chosen to represent the Italian national baseball team in the 2017 World Baseball Classic and the 2019 European Baseball Championship. He played for the team at the Africa/Europe 2020 Olympic Qualification tournament in Italy in September 2019, and was suspended for 12 games for his part in a brawl in that tournament on September 21.

References

External links

1989 births
Living people
Baseball players from Phoenix, Arizona
Baseball infielders
Arizona State Sun Devils baseball players
State College Spikes players
West Virginia Power players
Bradenton Marauders players
Altoona Curve players
Arkansas Travelers players
Oklahoma City Dodgers players
Tulsa Drillers players
Estrellas Orientales players
American expatriate baseball players in the Dominican Republic
American people of Italian descent
Venados de Mazatlán players
American expatriate baseball players in Mexico
2017 World Baseball Classic players
Columbus Clippers players
Pensacola Blue Wahoos players
Rochester Red Wings players
St. Paul Saints players
2019 European Baseball Championship players
Citizens of Italy through descent
Lehigh Valley IronPigs players